Ronald Edward Harris (born 13 November 1944), known by the nickname "Chopper" for his tough style of defending, is an English former footballer who played for Chelsea in the 1960s and 1970s. Harris captained Chelsea to FA Cup and UEFA Cup Winners' Cup success, and made a club record 795 appearances. His brother Allan Harris was also a professional footballer and they were teammates at Chelsea in the mid-1960s.

Chelsea
Harris was a member of the Chelsea side which won the FA Youth Cup in 1961 and made his senior club debut in February 1962 in a 1–0 win against Sheffield Wednesday. Within a year, he had established himself as a regular in the side, a position he would hold for the next eighteen years. He formed an important part of new Chelsea manager Tommy Docherty's youth-oriented re-building of the club after relegation from the First Division alongside the likes of Peter Bonetti, Peter Osgood and Bobby Tambling.

Upon the club's return to the top division, Harris solidified his reputation as an uncompromising – yet talented – defender with a series of strong (and sometimes notorious) performances. His first honours with Chelsea came with a League Cup win over Leicester City in 1965. In the same season, Chelsea were challenging for the league title for most of the year but ultimately finished third after winning just one of their final five matches. He became club captain the following year when Terry Venables left for Tottenham Hotspur and became the youngest ever captain to lead out a side in the 1967 FA Cup Final, although they lost 2–1 to Tottenham. Chelsea, led by Harris, reached another FA Cup final three years later, this time against Leeds United – a side then at their peak in English football. He won four caps for England U23 between 1966 and 1968.

That 1970 FA Cup Final is notorious for being one of the most physical of all time, it saw Harris come into his own in the role of both inspirational leader and uncompromising tackler. With Leeds having taken a 2–1 lead at Wembley with just six minutes remaining, it was his quick free kick which led to Ian Hutchinson's  headed equaliser to take the game to a replay. During the replay at Old Trafford his late tackle on Leeds' playmaker Eddie Gray after just eight minutes (just one of many late tackles committed by both sides), left the latter a virtual passenger for the rest of the match: Chelsea eventually won 2–1 after extra-time.

The following season saw Harris lift Chelsea's first major European honour – the UEFA Cup Winners' Cup – in another replayed final against Real Madrid in Athens. Chelsea also reached a second League Cup final in 1972, but surprisingly lost to Stoke in what proved to be his last major final for the club.

Moves
While many of Chelsea's star players departed during the 1970s ( due to Peter Osgood and Alan Hudson falling out with manager Dave Sexton, and due to the financial crisis caused by the building of the new East Stand, and the financial impact of relegation )  Harris remained ever-present in the side throughout a decade which saw them relegated twice and promoted once, although he was replaced as Club Captain by John Hollins at the tail end of the 1971/72 season. Harris was primarily a central defender in the mould of Bobby Moore and Norman Hunter but in later years he was often played out of position as circumstances dictated. After the retirement of Eddie McCreadie he played at left back for a considerable time and was used as cover at right back when injuries left the financially struggling Chelsea short of cover. In the closing stages of his career he also played as a holding midfield player in a role similar to Claude Makelele, providing a screen for a defence that was often caught out by counter-attacks. Over an 18-year period Harris was rarely out of the first team. In 10 seasons he averaged 41 league games out of 42 and in 5 other seasons he averaged over 37 games. He finally left Chelsea in 1980 to become a player-coach at Brentford, having played a record 795 games for Chelsea. He later had a brief stint as player-manager of Aldershot.

In retirement
Harris was a professional greyhound trainer for several years during the 1990s.

Career statistics

Playing honours
Chelsea
 European Cup Winners' Cup
Winners: 1970–71
 FA Cup
Winners: 1969–70
Runner-up: 1966–67
 Football League Cup
Winners: 1964–65
Runner-up: 1971–72
 FA Charity Shield
Runner-up 1970
 Football League Second Division
Runner-up: 1962–63, 1976–77
 FA Youth Cup
Winners: 1960–61

Individual honours
Chelsea's Most League Appearances – 657
Chelsea's Most FA Cup Appearances – 64
Chelsea's Most Appearances in Total – 795
Special Recognition Award 2010–2011

References

External links
Ron CHOPPER Harris official blog
Ron CHOPPER Harris official website
Newcastle fans profile
 Ron Harris at chelseafc.com
Daily Telegraph / Telegraph Online article on Ron Harris
Mirrorfootball.co.uk Article and video interview with Harris

1944 births
Living people
English footballers
England under-23 international footballers
Chelsea F.C. players
Brentford F.C. players
Aldershot F.C. players
English football managers
Aldershot F.C. managers
Association football defenders
British greyhound racing trainers
Footballers from the London Borough of Hackney
FA Cup Final players
Association football coaches